Kinako ( or ) is roasted soybean flour, a product commonly used in Japanese cuisine. In English, it is usually called "roasted soy flour". More precisely it is "roasted whole soy flour". Usage of the word kinako appeared in cookbooks from the late Muromachi period (1336–1573). Kinako means "yellow flour" in Japanese.

Production
Kinako is produced by finely grinding roasted soybeans into powder. The skin of the soybean is typically removed before pulverizing the beans, but some varieties of kinako retain the roasted skin. Yellow soybeans produce a yellow kinako, and green soybeans produce a light-green product. Kinako, being composed of soybeans, is a healthy topping and flavouring which contains B vitamins and protein. Compared to boiled soybeans, however, the protein in kinako is not easily digested.

Usage

Kinako is widely used in Japanese cooking, but is strongly associated with dango and wagashi. Dango, dumplings made from mochiko (rice flour), are commonly coated with kinako. Examples include ohagi and Abekawa-mochi. Kinako, when combined with milk or soy milk, can also be made into a drink. One example of its use in popular foods is warabimochi, which is a famous kinako-covered sweet.

See also
 List of soy-based foods
 Pinole
 Besan
Matcha, green powder

References

External links

History of Roasted Whole Soy Flour (Kinako), Soy Coffee, and Soy Chocolate (2012) Archived 2013

Soy-based foods
Japanese cuisine
Food powders